Ķeipene Parish is an administrative unit of Ogre Municipality in the Vidzeme region of Latvia.

Towns, villages and settlements of Ķeipene Parish 
 Ķeipene
 Vatrāne
 Diedziņš

References 

Parishes of Latvia
Ogre Municipality
Vidzeme